The SUN is an English-language newspaper based in Hong Kong, published since 1995. It targets Filipinos in Hong Kong.

References

External links 
 

English-language newspapers published in Hong Kong